Rock Candy Records is an independent record label based in the United Kingdom. Founded by ex-Kerrang! writers Derek Oliver and Dante Bonutto, the label primarily specializes in CD reissues of rock and heavy metal albums from the 1970s and 1980s.

The label takes its name from the Montrose song of the same name.

Artists 
Artists released by the company include Max Webster, Montrose, Toto, Malice and Rhino Bucket, among others.

References

External links
 Official site

British independent record labels
Record labels established in 2005
Reissue record labels